In 1921, factions were banned in the Russian Communist Party (Bolsheviks).

Since 1920 a majority of the Congress of the Communist Party of the Soviet Union had become concerned about oppositionist groups within the Communist Party. For example, the Democratic Centralists had been set up in March 1919 and by 1921 Alexander Shlyapnikov had set up the Workers' Opposition. The Congress regarded these as distractions within the party when unity was needed in order to neutralise the major crises of 1921, such as the famines, and Kronstadt Rebellion.

Resolution on Party Unity 1921

Factions were also commencing to criticize Lenin's leadership. Consequently, the 10th Party Congress passed a Resolution On Party Unity, a ban on factions to eliminate factionalism within the party in 1921. The resolution stated as follows.

 Under the present conditions (apparently, the ongoing Kronstadt rebellion), party unity was more necessary than ever.
 The Kronstadt rebellion was being exploited by "the bourgeois counter-revolutionaries and whiteguards in all countries of the world" in order to "secure the overthrow of the dictatorship of the proletariat in Russia".
 Criticism, "while absolutely necessary", was supposed to be "submitted immediately, without any delay", that is, without prior deliberation in any faction, "for consideration and decision to the leading local and central bodies of the Party."
 The "deviation towards syndicalism and anarchism" was rejected "in principle", but the central proposals of the Democratic Centralism group were accepted.
 All factions were dissolved.

The ban on factions after Lenin's death
Faction members (such as members of "Workers' Truth") would be expelled from the Party in December 1923. Big opposition factions (such as Leon Trotsky's 'Left Opposition' and such as oppositionist groups around Nikolai Bukharin and Grigory Zinoviev) again appeared after the civil war ended. These factions were tolerated for several years, leading some modern Marxists to claim that the ban on factions was intended to be temporary. When Trotsky and Zinoviev were expelled on November 12, 1927, the ban on factions was however used to justify this, and there is no language in the discussion at the 10th Party Congress suggesting that it was intended to be temporary (Protokoly 523-548).

A sense of a deficit in democracy was present in calls by Trotsky and The Declaration of 46  in 1923.

Historians T. H. Rigby and Sheila Fitzpatrick believe that the autumn purges of 1921 were also connected to the ban on factions. In the process of the purge, every Communist was subpoenaed in front of a purge commission and forced to justify their credentials as a revolutionary; Lenin argued this was necessary as to not cause the direction of the revolution to be deviated from its original aim. Admittedly, the purges were officially not directed against oppositionists, but against careerists and class enemies. Indeed, the Central Committee circular on the purge went as far as to explicitly ban its potential use to repress "people with other ideas in the party (such as the Worker's Opposition, for example)". While acknowledging this, Fitzpatrick and Rigby nevertheless consider it "difficult to believe that no Oppositionists were among the almost 25% of party members judged unworthy".  Still, such use of that first purge must have been limited, since no prominent members of the opposition factions were purged, and they never complained of such a thing, while still being outspoken about other forms of mistreatment.

References

External links 
 Preliminary Draft Resolution Of The Tenth Congress Of The R.C.P. On Party Unity
 The Principles of Democracy and Proletarian Dictatorship Trotsky's work at marxists.org.
 Bureaucratism and Factional Groups Trotsky's work at marxists.org.

Factions in the Communist Party of the Soviet Union